The Hillsdale Local School District is a public school district in Ashland County, Ohio, United States, based in Jeromesville, Ohio.

Schools
The Hillsdale Local School District has one elementary school, one middle school, and one high school. Construction of a new combined campus began on September 30, 2020 and the new facility is scheduled to open at the start of the 2022/2023 school year.

Elementary school
Hillsdale Elementary School

Middle school
Hillsdale Middle School

High school
Hillsdale High School

References

External links

Hillsdale Local School District
School districts in Ohio